The Priestley Cup is a cricket cup competition contested by clubs in the Bradford Premier League. It is one of the most prestigious club competitions in English cricket and is widely reported by regional media. Matches are played on Sunday afternoons over five rounds, with the final being played at a pre-determined neutral venue in late August.

The Cup is named for Sir William Priestley, who was President of the Bradford Cricket League when the competition was founded and donated the silver trophy that continues to be presented to the victorious club.

27 teams have won the competition, which celebrated its centenary in 2004.  Undercliffe has been the most successful club with 13 wins up to 2008.

Winners

References

External links
Priestley Cup - official site

Cricket competitions in Yorkshire